Doug Sams (born July 12, 1955) is an American former gridiron football coach.  He served as the head football coach at Urbana University in 1988, Fairmont State University from 1992 to 2001, and Northern Michigan University from 2002 to 2005, compiling a career college football coaching record of 70–82.  Sams was an assistant coach for several teams in the Canadian Football League (CFL): the Montreal Alouettes, Edmonton Eskimos, Ottawa Rough Riders, and Hamilton Tiger-Cats.

Head coaching record

References

External links
 Edmonton Eskimos profile 

1955 births
Living people
American football wide receivers
Delaware State Hornets football coaches
Edinboro Fighting Scots football coaches
Edmonton Elks coaches
Fairmont State Fighting Falcons football coaches
Hamilton Tiger-Cats coaches
Montreal Alouettes coaches
Northern Michigan Wildcats football coaches
Oregon State Beavers football players
Ottawa Rough Riders coaches
Sportspeople from Walla Walla, Washington
Stanford Cardinal football coaches
Urbana Blue Knights football coaches